Sirduleh (also Romanized as Sīrdūleh; also known as Sīrehdūleh) is a village in Shirez Rural District, Bisotun District, Harsin County, Kermanshah Province, Iran. At the 2006 census, its population was 109, in 26 families.

References 

Populated places in Harsin County